Metropolitan railway may refer to:

 Metropolitan line, part of the London Underground
 Metropolitan Railway, a former underground railway in London
 Metropolitan District Railway, a former underground railway in London
 Metropolitan Street Railway (Toronto), a radial railway that ran from Toronto to Newmarket and to Sutton

See also
 Rapid transit